Kenneth Raper (born 15 May 1956) is an English former professional footballer who played in the Football League for Torquay United.

Career
Raper was born in Stanley, County Durham and began his career with Stoke City. He failed to break into the first team at Stoke and joined Fourth Division side Torquay United in 1977 where he spent two seasons making 58 appearances before returning to Staffordshire with Leek Town.

Career statistics
Source:

References

1956 births
Living people
English footballers
Association football midfielders
English Football League players
Stoke City F.C. players
Torquay United F.C. players
Leek Town F.C. players